Burn scar contracture is the tightening of the skin after a second or third degree burn. When skin is burned, the surrounding skin begins to pull together, resulting in a contracture. It needs to be treated as soon as possible because the scar can result in restriction of movement around the injured area. This is mediated by myofibroblasts.

Diagnosis

Treatment
Burn scar contractures do not go away on their own, although may improve with the passage of time, with occupational therapy and physiotherapy, and with splinting. If persistent  the person may need the contracture to be surgically released. Techniques may include local skin flaps (z-plasty) or skin grafting (full thickness or split thickness). There are also pharmacy and drug-store treatments that can be used to help scar maturation, especially silicone gel treatments. Prevention of contracture formation is key.  For instance, in the case of a burned hand one would splint the hand and wrap each finger individually.  In the instance of burns on the neck, hyperextension of the neck (i.e. no use of pillows) should be maintained during the healing process. Carbon dioxide laser therapy is now also used to aid in the loosening of surrounding skin, although is yet to form as part of an official global rehabilitation program.

References

Scarring
Burns